al-Jazuli may refer to:

Abu Musa al-Jazuli (1146–1211), Moroccan philologist and grammarian
Muhammad al-Jazuli (1404–1465), Moroccan Sufi leader
Al-Jazuli Daf'allah (born 1935), Prime Minister of Sudan

See also
Zawiya of Sidi Muhammad Ben Sliman al-Jazuli, an Islamic religious complex in Marrakesh, Morocco

Jazuli (disambiguation)

Arabic-language surnames